New Jersey's 2nd legislative district is one of 40 in the state, covering the Atlantic County municipalities of Absecon City, Atlantic City, Brigantine City, Buena Borough, Buena Vista Township, Egg Harbor City, Egg Harbor Township, Folsom Borough, Hamilton Township, Linwood City, Longport Borough, Margate City, Mullica Township, Northfield City, Pleasantville City, Somers Point City and Ventnor City as of the 2011 apportionment. Except for an eight-year period from 1974 until 1982, the 2nd District has been exclusively made up of municipalities from Atlantic County since 1967.

Demographic characteristics
As of the 2020 United States census, the district had a population of 216,156, of whom 170,802 (79.0%) were of voting age. The racial makeup of the district was 116,893 (54.1%) White, 36,312 (16.8%) African American, 1,051 (0.5%) Native American, 17,740 (8.2%) Asian, 320 (0.1%) Pacific Islander, 23,314 (10.8%) from other races, and 20,526 (9.5%) from two or more races. Hispanic or Latino of any race were 44,899 (20.8%) of the population.

The district had 165,449 registered voters as of December 1, 2021, of whom 58,399 (35.3%) were registered as unaffiliated, 61,149 (37.0%) were registered as Democrats, 43,534 (26.3%) were registered as Republicans, and 2,367 (1.4%) were registered to other parties.

Political representation
The district is represented for the 2022–2023 Legislative Session in the State Senate by Vincent J. Polistina (R, [[[Egg Harbor Township, New Jersey|Egg Harbor Township]]) and in the General Assembly by Don Guardian (R, Atlantic City) and Claire Swift (R, Margate City).

It is entirely located within New Jersey's 2nd congressional district.

1965–1973
During the period of time after the 1964 Supreme Court decision in Reynolds v. Sims and before the establishment of a 40-district legislature in 1973, the 2nd District was based around Atlantic County except for the 1965 Senate elections. In that election, the 2nd District encompassed all of Salem and Cumberland counties with the election being won by Democrat John A. Waddington.

In the following sessions, the Senate seat (one Senator elected in each election) and Assembly seats (two people elected per election) encompassed all of Atlantic County. Republican Frank S. Farley won the 1967 Senate election but was defeated by Democrat Joseph McGahn in 1971. Republicans Albert S. Smith and Samuel A. Curcio won the 1967 and 1969 Assembly elections but Democrats Steven P. Perskie and James A. Colasurdo won the 1971 election.

District composition since 1973
Upon the creation of the 40 equal-population districts for the State Legislature in 1973, the 2nd District encompassed all of Atlantic County plus Burlington County townships Washington and Bass River and Ocean County's Little Egg Harbor Township and Tuckerton. For the 1980s 2nd District, the Burlington and Ocean County municipalities were removed as were Buena, Buena Vista Township, and Folsom. The 1990s version of the district was made further compact by shifting Hammonton and Egg Harbor City to other districts. In the 2001 redistricting, Egg Harbor City returned to the 2nd but Somers Point shifted to the 1st District.

The 2011 apportionment added Buena (from District 1), Buena Vista Township (1st District), Folsom (9th District) and Somers Point (1st District). Municipalities that had been in the 2nd District as part of the 2001 apportionment that were shifted out of the district are Corbin City (to 1st District), Estell Manor (1st District), Galloway Township (9th District), Port Republic (9th District) and Weymouth Township (1st District).

Election history

Election results, 1973–present

Senate

General Assembly

Election results, 1965–1973

Senate

General Assembly

References

Atlantic County, New Jersey
02